The 2015 President's Cup is a professional tennis tournament played on outdoor hard courts. It is the tenth edition of the men's tournament and the seventh edition for women, part of the 2015 ATP Challenger Tour and the 2015 ITF Women's Circuit respectively. Offering prize money of $75,000 for the men and $25,000 for the women, the events took place in Astana, Kazakhstan, on 27 July –2 August 2015.

Men's singles main draw entrants

Seeds 

 1 Rankings as of 20 July 2015

Other entrants 
The following players received wildcards into the singles main draw:
  Chung Yun-seong
  Jurabek Karimov
  Timur Khabibulin
  Roman Khassanov

The following player received entry with a protected ranking:
  Amir Weintraub

The following players received entry from the qualifying draw:
  Sanjar Fayziev
  Andrei Vasilevski
  Markos Kalovelonis
  Denis Yevseyev

Women's singles main draw entrants

Seeds 

 1 Rankings as of 20 July 2015

Other entrants 
The following players received wildcards into the singles main draw:
  Polina Malykh
  Arina Taluenko
  Zhanelya Turarbek
  Dina Zhamiyeva

The following players received entry from the qualifying draw:
  Karina Kalkenova
  Ekaterina Kunina
  Ksenia Laskutova
  Polina Merenkova
  Viktoryia Mun
  Angelina Skidanova
  Sofia Smagina
  Adeliya Zabirova

The following player received entry by a lucky loser spot:
  Aleksandra Stakhanova

Champions

Men's singles 

  Mikhail Kukushkin def.  Evgeny Donskoy 6–2, 6–2

Women's singles 
  Natela Dzalamidze def.  Ksenia Pervak, 6–6, ret.

Men's doubles 

  Konstantin Kravchuk /  Denys Molchanov def.  Chung Yun-seong /  Djurabeck Karimov 6–2, 6–2

Women's doubles 
  Natela Dzalamidze /  Alena Tarasova def.  Başak Eraydın /  Ksenia Palkina, 6–0, 6–1

External links 
  
 2015 President's Cup Women's tournament at ITFtennis.com
 2015 President's Cup Men's tournament at ITFtennis.com

2015
2015 ATP Challenger Tour
2015 ITF Women's Circuit
Hard court tennis tournaments
Tennis tournaments in Kazakhstan